is a passenger railway station in the city of Maebashi, Gunma Prefecture, Japan, operated by the private railway operator Jōmō Electric Railway Company.

Lines

Station layout
The station consists of a single island platform connected to the station building by a level crossing.

Platforms

Adjacent stations

History
Kasukawa Station was opened on November 10, 1928. A new station building was completed on November 30, 2004.

Surrounding area
former Kasukawa village hall
Kasukawa Post Office

See also
 List of railway stations in Japan

External links

  
	

Stations of Jōmō Electric Railway
Railway stations in Gunma Prefecture
Railway stations in Japan opened in 1928
Maebashi